Yeghishe I also known as Yeghishe I Rshtunetsi (birthday unknown, born in Rshtunik, Armenia – died 946, Aghtamar, Armenia) was the Catholicos of All Armenians in 941–946. Yeghishe I succeeded his brother Catholicos Theodore I. Ruled the Church from Aghtamar, at the time – the Holy See of the Armenian Apostolic Church. Yeghishe Rshtunetsi was the Bishop of Rshtunik and after the death of Theodore I was elected Catholicos by the initiative of the King of Vaspurakan.

Catholicoi of Armenia
946 deaths
Armenian Oriental Orthodox Christians
Year of birth unknown
10th-century Armenian people
10th-century Oriental Orthodox archbishops